Lord Anderson may refer to:
 Adam Anderson, Lord Anderson (1797–1853), Scottish judge, Solicitor General for Scotland and Fellow of the Royal Society of Edinburgh
 Andrew Anderson, Lord Anderson (1862–1936), Scottish barrister, judge and Liberal Party politician
 David Anderson, Baron Anderson of Ipswich (born 1961), British barrister
 Donald Anderson, Baron Anderson of Swansea (born 1939), Welsh Labour Party politician

See also
 Ruth Smeeth, Baroness Anderson of Stoke-on-Trent (born 1979), British Labour Party politician
 Earl of Yarborough, peerage created in the United Kingdom (Anderson-Pelham family)
 Anderson baronets, nine baronetcies in the United Kingdom (all extinct)
 Anderson (surname)